Inga Grigoryevna Artamonova (29 August 1936 – 4 January 1966) was a Soviet speed skater, the first four-time Allround World Champion in women's speed skating history. After her marriage in 1959 to fellow speed skater Gennady Voronin, she was also known as Inga Voronina.

At the age of twelve, Inga Artamonova began rowing, becoming Master of Sports of the USSR and winning in the USSR Junior Championships. Later, she began speed skating. Skating for Dynamo in Moscow, Artamonova won the World Allround Speed Skating Championships in 1957, 1958, and 1962, and was second in 1963 and 1964 before capturing her fourth World Championships title in 1965. She also was five times Soviet Allround Champion and 26 times Soviet Champion in individual distances. Over the course of her career, Artamonova set of a number of world records, including four in two days in 1962 when she set new marks on the 500 m, 1,500 m, and 3,000 m, which also resulted in a new world record on the mini combination (500 m – 1,000 m – 1,500 m – 3,000 m; the distances then in use at the World Allround Championships for women). She was also eight times winner of the prestigious Kirov Prize, winning all editions between 1958 and 1965.

Her husband Gennady Voronin, who could not deal with all Artamonova's successes, had by this time become an alcoholic and seen his own speed skating career vanish. Murdered by Gennady at the age of 29, Artamonova was interred in the Vagankovskoye Cemetery in Moscow. She is the author of the book "I Am Learning to Go on the Ground", which was published after her death, in 1967.

Medals
An overview of medals won by Artamonova at important championships she participated in, listing the years in which she won each:

World records
Over the course of her career, Artamonova skated 5 world records:

References

External links
Inga Artamonova at SkateResults.com
An article about Inga by her brother Vladimir Artamonov  (in Russian)
The book about Inga Artamonova (in Russian)

1936 births
1966 deaths
Speed skaters from Moscow
Russian female speed skaters
Soviet female speed skaters
Dynamo sports society athletes
Burials at Vagankovo Cemetery
World record setters in speed skating
World Allround Speed Skating Championships medalists
Violence against women in Russia
Deaths by stabbing in Russia
People murdered in the Soviet Union
People murdered in Moscow
1966 murders in the Soviet Union